"Sons of California" is a fight song of the University of California, Berkeley, as well as the University of California, Davis. It was composed by Clinton "Brick" Morse in 1896.  Although it was originally an unpopular song among students because of its slow and solemn hymn, the Cal Band began performing a more lively version in the 1930s. From then on, "Sons of California" would remain one of the best known songs at the University.

Lyrics 

 Note: In each verse, the second and third "California's are sung as Cal-eee-for-knee-yuh.

External links
Cal Band page
Cal Aggie Band-Uh!

Pac-12 Conference fight songs
American college songs
College fight songs in the United States
University of California, Berkeley
University of California, Davis